The Ashcroft-Merrill Historic District is a historic district in Ramah, New Mexico which was listed on the National Register of Historic Places in 1990.

It is a  area located at the junction of Bloomfield and McNeil Streets.  It included three contributing buildings, two contributing structures, and one contributing site.

It includes work by stonemason John William Waite.

It includes a hotel.

References

		
National Register of Historic Places in McKinley County, New Mexico
Hotels in New Mexico